This is a list of internet service providers in Saudi Arabia.

Internet in Saudi Arabia is provided by several service providers: the Saudi Telecom, the CITC, and the ISP which provides the monthly subscriptions.

ISPs in Saudi Arabia
Saudi Telecom Company (STC)
Integrated Telecom Company (ITC)
Sahara Net
Mobily
NetSpeed
Zain
NourNet
Inspirenet
DETASAD

See also 

 Ministry of Media (Saudi Arabia)

References

Internet service providers of Saudi Arabia
Internet in Saudi Arabia